My Big Fat Obnoxious Boss was a television show on the Fox Network that was filmed in July 2004 and aired from November–December 2004. Similar to My Big Fat Obnoxious Fiance, it was a parody of shows such as The Apprentice. The contestants performed several tasks that they were all told would help them win a job at the Chicago-based conglomerate IOCOR and a $250,000 prize. However, none of the contestants knew that the company – and the position – were fake.

The show was usually punctuated by the actions of the "boss" Mr. N. Paul Todd, whose name was an anagram of that of Donald Trump. The contestants learn about his multibillion-dollar venture capital firm IOCOR, and in any episode, he or a member of his "family" could usually be found doing something either to unsettle the contestants or to test the limit of their blindness to truth.

Fox advertised the show, along with another Apprentice-inspired show called The Rebel Billionaire, during the 2004 Major League Baseball playoffs. But the show received low ratings in the United States and was canceled after five episodes. Fox released the remaining 5 episodes online in late March 2005. All 10 episodes were broadcast in full in the UK on Channel 4 (and on Channel 4's sister station E4), in Australia on Channel 7 and later Fox8, in Singapore on Channel 5, in Poland on TV4 and Polsat, in Malaysia on 8TV and in Denmark on SBS Net. In 2008, the entire series – including the five unaired episodes in the US – aired on Fox Reality Channel. The show has attained a cult status and a good fan base in spite of its small run. In 2005, My Big Fat Obnoxious Boss was one of several television programs cited in a class-action lawsuit filed by the Writers Guild of America concerning labor law violations.

Rules

The rules of the game were similar to The Apprentice. The teams would then compete in a challenge test the contestant's skills in business-related objectives - however, the tasks are absurd in nature, included selling hot soup on a hot day, creating and selling art they made out of scraps and promoting other ridiculous products. The members of the losing team met Mr. Todd in the boardroom on the next day, where he derided their performance. The team boss nominated two teammates for elimination – Unlike The Apprentice (where the team leader is also eligible for elimination alongside their nominees),the losing boss is awarded total Immunity from that week's elimination because Mr. Todd explained that, in real life, the boss is never held responsible. 
The audience would then see N. Paul Todd referring to "the real boss" for the decision on who was to go between the bottom 2. The player not eliminated became the team boss, and the winning team named a new team boss.

The real boss was not seen or heard until the final episode and was kept a complete secret from the contestants. The official website suggested that the real boss could be Donald Trump's ex-wife Ivana Trump or Oprah Winfrey, although David Hickman did refer to the boss as a "him." The real boss gave no reason for the decision, so Todd was given free rein to make it up as he went along. In the final episode, "the real boss" was revealed to be a chimpanzee who responded to the name of "Mowgli" and who made his decisions by spinning a wheel with the names of the contestants.

N. Paul Todd

N. Paul Todd was played by actor William August, a graduate of Harvard University and an experienced California attorney.

August described Todd as a man who "probably has a number of sexual harassment lawsuits pending."

Todd's catchphrase for elimination was "Get the hell out of my office." Another of his catchphrases was "Welcome to my world."

A variety of assistants helped Mr. Todd with his contests. His alleged Vice President Jamie Samuels is sent to hate the women, while the COO David Hickman is "a little too excited about these fresh-faced young men." Mr. Todd also relies on his wife Lynn and his son Kent to help judge the competition when a member of the executive team is not available.

Mr. N. Paul Todd is an anagram of Donald Trump, host of The Apprentice at that time.

Cast

Contestants

Teams
The contestants were initially split into a male and female team. Each team was responsible for naming their opponent. The men named the female team Femron, a portmanteau of female and Enron. The women named the male team Concad, a portmanteau of con and cad.

The teams were re-organized in episode 4 based on the contestants' attractiveness. At the beginning of episode 8, the remaining five players were combined into a united team for an elimination, where Damien was named team boss. Afterwards, the four players left over were split into two teams for the episode's challenge. Following that challenge, the three finalists were on their own.

 The contestant won the competition.
 The contestant won as team boss on his/her team.
 The contestant lost as team boss on his/her team - but was awarded immunity per the rules.
 The contestant was on the winning team for this task.
 The contestant was on the losing team for this task.
 The contestant was brought to the final boardroom.
 The contestant was fired.
 The contestant won a task granting him/her immunity.

Episodes

Episode 1: How Low Can You Go?
Air date: November 7, 2004
Days: Days 1–3 of the competition.
Summary: Mr. Todd introduces himself, his company, and the game to the contestants over hors d'oeuvres made from cheap ingredients. He splits the contestants into men's and women's teams and assigns the teams to come up with the opposing team's names.
Task: Given some garbage and no money, raise the most money by begging.
Concad (men's team) boss: Mike
Femron (women's team) boss: Tonia
Winning team: Femron, $334.10
Reasons for win: The women of Femron pretend they are raising money for a cheerleading camp. By comparison, Concad raises money for the "Help Chicago" charity which would pass money on to Chicago-area charities.
Reward: Sleep on mattresses that were stuffed with $10,000 each, however the women find this a very uncomfortable experience.
Losing team: Concad, $312.46
Penalty: Sleep in a vacant lot under the L in the worst area of Chicago.
Eliminated: Dan. The explanation was that Dan wore a more expensive suit than Mr. Todd and that Mr. Todd wasn't looking for any more "suits". Robert survived elimination.

Episode 2: The Sword and the Soup
Airdate: November 14, 2004
Days: Days 3–6 of the competition.
Summary: Mr. Todd invites six of the contestants to tour his mansion and meet his wife and daughter. The mansion features Todd's most prized possessions, including two vases belonging to Napoleon, a 1929 Steinway piano, chandeliers identical to those in the West Wing, the Excalibur sword, and his first million dollars.
Task: Sell hot soup in Chicago on a hot July day.
Concad boss: Robert
Femron boss: Annette
Winning team: Concad, $521
Reasons for win: Concad initially interferes with Femron's sales. After shaking off the men, Femron claims to be a women-owned catering company. The IOCOR staff deploys italian ice vendors to follow both teams, though primarily Femron in an attempt to sabotage their sales. Concad pretends David is a model for the Abercrombie & Fitch catalog and proceeds to use their sex appeal, similar to the Femron strategy from the first episode.
Losing team: Femron, $431
Eliminated: Christy. Before eliminating her, Mr. Todd told her that she was not a team player. Kerry survived elimination.

Episode 3: That's Fascinating
Airdate: November 21, 2004
Days: Days 6–10 of the competition.
Summary: Mr. Todd invites three women to join him on the yacht Perseverance II and three men to join him at Harborside International Golf Center. Mr. Todd gave the women bikinis on the boat and after going swimming in Lake Michigan, but did not show up to his appointment with the men, leaving them waiting for over three hours. Todd also leads the women to think that as a result of the boat trip they have forged a close relationship with him, whereas all he has ever said in conversation with each of them is "that's fascinating".
Task: Create a mascot for Drycon, a company that sells hydrocyanic acid, with an informational presentation in front of 8-year-old children and their parents. The children voted on the winning team.
Concad boss: Damien
Femron boss: Kerry
Winning team: Concad
Reasons for win: The men feature a superhero, Captain Drycon, who fights against villains that personify the symptoms of exposure to hydrocyanic acid. Their jingle was "Drycon everywhere you look." The women composed an ensemble of characters that graphically demonstrated the symptoms and their jingle was not catchy. Mr. Todd lamented that as the most attractive, Whitney did not belong in a frog suit.
Note: The frog suit used in this episode was also used in the Charity Drive episode of Arrested Development.
Losing team: Femron
Eliminated: Elli. Mr. Todd praised Elli as creative and the only Femron team member with "brass ones." Whitney survived elimination despite Mr. Todd's accusations of manipulating him.

Episode 4: Craptacular!
Airdate: December 5, 2004
Challenge: Sell bogus products to the public and the most sales wins. Products include canned oxygen gas, "natural" tampons, and reusable toilet paper.
Concad boss: David
Femron boss: Whitney
Winning team: Femron
Losing team: Concad
Eliminated: Tonia. Kerry survived elimination.

Episode 5: Thanks, I Appreciate That
Airdate: December 12, 2004
Challenge: Teams raced to perform certain office tasks while under fire from paintballs that Mr. N. Paul Todd shot at them. Members had to shield the team boss from getting hit or be penalized. A tie breaker came down to a 10 ball shootout.
Concad boss: Kerry
Femron boss: Annette
Winning team: Femron
Losing team: Concad
Eliminated: Robert. David survived elimination.

Episode 6: Next Stop, the Guggenheim!
Airdate: (on web) March 2005
Challenge: Make works of art out of garbage and sell them at an art gallery they run themselves. One of the members of each team has to masquerade as the artist who made the works of art.
Concad boss: David
Femron boss: Douglas
Winning team: Concad
Losing team: Femron
Eliminated: Whitney. Annette survived elimination.

Episode 7: Drop Dead Gorgeous
Airdate: (on web) March 2005
Challenge: Design an advertising campaign for 1 of 3 products. They include home security land mines, breast milk, and plastic surgery for the deceased.
Concad boss: Damien
Femron boss: Annette
Winning team: Concad
Losing team: Femron
Eliminated: Douglas. Mike and Annette survived elimination. (Team boss had no immunity)

Episode 8: Blowin' in the Wind
Airdate: (on web) March 2005
 Instant Elimination: Mr. Todd invited the contestants, to the boardroom to merge the teams and task the players with their next task. Damien was elected to be the boss, and Mr. Todd revealed that the task was to eliminate a player instantly. While the contestants were given an hour to deliberate and negotiate, the ultimate decision rested with Damien.
Eliminated: David, per Damien's decision. David was chosen for being the most honest out of the final five.
Challenge: Sell as much distribution of T-shirts, baseball hats, and mugs that had written on them "Chicago is for losers", "The windy city blows", and "I hate Chicago" to real shop owners as possible.
Winning team: Annette and Kerry (Femron)
Losing team: Damien and Mike (Concad)
Eliminated: The elimination was shown in the next episode.

Episode 9: My Kingdom for a Chicken
Airdate: (on web) March 2005
Summary: The contestants are given a live chicken, and are challenged to barter their way to an item of higher value.  The contestant with the item receiving the lowest appraised value is eliminated.
Eliminated: Damien. Mike survived this elimination, which was from the last episode's challenge.
First place:  Mike, 1996 Cristal worth $133.33
Second place: Annette, men's watch worth $31.67
Eliminated: Kerry, Sony CD/DVD player worth $20.00

Episode 10: The Real Boss is...
Airdate: (on web) March 2005
Summary: Two IOCOR Board Members questioned the Final 2 about the competition and Mr. Todd before the corporation could declare a winner. Then, the joking nature of the show was revealed. However, the Finalists were told that the competition was still real and the intended prize money was increased to $350,000. After one final "decision" from "the real boss" (now revealed to be a spin of the wheel by Mowgli), Annette won the competition. Runner-Up Mike was then revealed to have won a consolation prize of $200,000 and both finalists were told one final time to "Get The Hell out of Mr. Todd's Office"
Winner, $350,000: Annette
Runner-up, $200,000: Mike

After the show
Annette became a professional model, and ironically, later appeared as "Trump's Executive Assistant" (boardroom lobby receptionist) on several episodes of The Celebrity Apprentice. Kerry wrote a book. As of 2007, Elli remained the president of Eye5. Jamie Denbo and Kent Sublette both moved on to late night television programs, with Denbo being featured on The Late Late Show and Sublette joining the writing staff of Saturday Night Live in 2007. Robert appeared on the 2014 reality show Utopia.

References
 Reality TV Calendar – info about contestants
 Reality News Online – Episode titles, summaries and recaps

External links

2000s American reality television series
2000s American parody television series
2004 American television series debuts
2004 American television series endings
Fox Broadcasting Company original programming
Reality television series parodies
English-language television shows
Television series by Rocket Science Laboratories